The 2000 Philippine Basketball Association (PBA) Governors' Cup was the third and last conference of the 2000 PBA season. It started on September 30 and ended on December 20, 2000. The tournament is an Import-laden format, which requires an import or a pure-foreign player for each team.

Format
The following format will be observed for the duration of the conference:
 One-round robin eliminations; 9 games per team; Teams are then seeded by basis on win–loss records. 
 The top eight teams after the eliminations will advance to the quarterfinals.
Quarterfinals:
Top four teams will have a twice-to-beat advantage against their opponent.
QF1: #1 vs. #8
QF2: #2 vs. #7
QF3: #3 vs. #6
QF4: #4 vs. #5
Best-of-five semifinals:
SF1: QF1 vs. QF4
SF2: QF2 vs. QF3
Third-place playoff: losers of the semifinals
Best-of-seven finals: winners of the semifinals

Imports
The following is the list of imports with the replacement imports being highlighted. GP is the number of games played in the conference.

(*) Played only in Pop Cola's 4th game vs Mobiline before Sean Green was recalled back and replaced anew by Bryatt Vann in their last game in the eliminations.

Elimination round

Team standings

Bracket

Quarterfinals

(1) Mobiline vs. (8) Barangay Ginebra

(2) Red Bull vs. (7) Sta. Lucia

(3) Tanduay vs. (6) San Miguel

(4) Purefoods vs. (5) Alaska

Semifinals

(1) Mobiline vs. (4) Purefoods

(2) Red Bull vs. (6) San Miguel

Third place playoff

Finals

References

External links
 PBA.ph

Governors' Cup
PBA Governors' Cup